Let's Dance is a 2019 French family comedy musical drama film written and directed by Ladislas Chollat. It is a remake of 2010 British 3D film StreetDance 3D. The film stars Rayane Bensetti, Fiorella Campanella and Guillaume de Tonquédec in the lead roles. The film was released on 27 March 2019 and received mixed reviews from critics. It was also streamed via Netflix on 4 December 2019.

Synopsis 
Joseph (Rayanne Bensetti), passionate dancer of hip-hop, refuses to enter the company of his father to attempt his luck in Paris. With his girlfriend, Emma (Fiorella Campanella) and his best friend Karim (Mehdi Kerkouche), he joins the Paris crew of Yuri, a famous breaker to attempt to win an international competition of hip-hop.

Cast 

 Rayane Bensetti as Joseph
 Fiorella Campanella as Emma
 Guillaume de Tonquédec as Rémi
 Alexia Giordano as Chloé
 Mehdi Kerkouche as Karim
 Line Renaud as Nicole

References

External links 

 
 

2019 films
2010s French-language films
French musical comedy-drama films
French-language Netflix original films
2010s musical comedy-drama films
2019 comedy films
2019 drama films
2010s French films